This is a list of the 45 territorial police forces and 3 special police forces of the United Kingdom. It does not include non-police law enforcement agencies or bodies of constables not constituted as police forces. 

For a list of all law enforcement agencies in the United Kingdom and its territories, see List of law enforcement agencies in the United Kingdom, Crown Dependencies and British Overseas Territories.

Table

List of territorial police forces by region

London

South East of England

East of England

South West of England

West Midlands of England

East Midlands of England

Yorkshire and the Humber

North East of England

North West of England

Wales

Scotland
 Police Scotland

Northern Ireland
 Police Service of Northern Ireland

See also
List of defunct law enforcement agencies in the United Kingdom
Law enforcement in the United Kingdom

References

External links
Police.uk – Information about crime and policing in England, Wales and Northern Ireland
List of UK police forces from Police.uk
Police forces - Information about area size for police force

Law enforcement in the United Kingdom
Police Forces
Police
Lists of law enforcement agencies